Lanrick Castle was a late 18th-century country house near Doune in central Scotland. It was demolished in 2002 despite being protected as a category B listed building. It was located on the south bank of the River Teith, in Stirling council area.

History
Once spelt Lanarkyngs, this name is taken as coming by metathesis from the old Brittonic word llanerch which meant "a clearing in a forest".

Lanrick was the property of the Haldane family. In the 19th century it belonged to the MacGregors, and was owned in the later 19th century by Robert Jardine of Castlemilk, MP. The house was probably built around 1790, and Gothic additions in the style of James Gillespie Graham were made in around 1815. Further alterations were made in the later 19th century, and parts of the building underwent internal remodelling in 1900.

Alistair Dickson inherited Lanrick in 1984. In April 1994 the castle was gutted by fire and lost its roof. On 16 February 2002 the remaining structure was demolished. Dickson was prosecuted for demolishing a listed structure without the necessary consent, and was fined £1,000 in January 2003. The sheriff also criticised Stirling Council for failing to take action to secure the building.

Other structures
Remaining buildings on the estate include the MacGregor Monument, erected by Sir Evan John Murray MacGregor in the earlier 19th century. This takes the form of a stone tree trunk, topped by a rotunda of Roman Doric columns. The monument is a category A listed building, and is included on the Buildings at Risk Register for Scotland. Lodges, a stable block, and a riverside grotto also survive on the estate.

References

External links
Lanrick Castle and the MacGregor Monument, Clan Gregor web site

Houses in Stirling (council area)
Demolished buildings and structures in Scotland
Category A listed buildings in Stirling (council area)
Buildings and structures demolished in 2002